The 2013 Italian general election was held on 24 and 25 February 2013 to determine the 630 members of the Chamber of Deputies and the 315 elective members of the Senate of the Republic for the 17th Italian Parliament. The centre-left alliance Italy Common Good, led by the Democratic Party (PD), obtained a clear majority of seats in the Chamber of Deputies thanks to a majority bonus that effectively trebled the number of seats assigned to the winning force and narrowly defeated the centre-right alliance of former Prime Minister Silvio Berlusconi in the popular vote. Close behind, the new anti-establishment Five Star Movement of comedian Beppe Grillo became the third force, well ahead of the centrist coalition of outgoing Prime Minister Mario Monti. In the Senate, no political group or party won an outright majority, resulting in a hung parliament.

In April 2013, a grand coalition between Italy Common Good, the Berlusconi coalition, and the centrists was formed. Berlusconi and his allies withdrew support of the coalition and formed a new Forza Italia six months later, which meant that the PD dominated the government coalition until the 2018 Italian general election.

Background
Following the European sovereign debt crisis, Prime Minister Silvio Berlusconi resigned from his position in November 2011. He was replaced as Prime Minister by technocratic Senator for Life Mario Monti.

In December 2012, Berlusconi announced his intention to run for Prime Minister for a sixth time. Shortly after, his party, The People of Freedom (PdL), withdrew endorsement for Monti's Cabinet and Monti announced he would resign after sending the annual budget to the Italian Parliament, which was expected by Christmas. The Constitution of Italy then requires an election to be held within 70 days of the dissolution of the parliament by President Giorgio Napolitano. Monti's resignation came after he said that, following the PdL's withdrawal, he "matured [to] the conviction that we could not continue like this any longer," and that he could not govern with a loss of support for his platform.

During Monti's tenure, Italy had faced tax increases and state spending cuts, as well as reforms intended to improve the competitiveness of the Italian economy. On the other hand, PdL parliamentary party leader Angelino Alfano told parliament on 7 December that Italy's debt, unemployment, and tax rates had risen in contrast to the economy since Monti became prime minister. In the approximately one year since Monti took office, unemployment rose by almost two percent. Previously Monti had controversially told the rising tide of youth unemployment to forget about a steady job for life, saying such is "monotonous [anyway and] it's nice to change and take on challenges." He also called for changes to Article 18 of the 1970 Workers Statute that forbids companies with over 15 employees from sacking an employee without "just cause", saying that it "can be pernicious for Italy's growth."

The same reforms and austerity-focused policies which upset many Italians are perceived to have improved international confidence in Italy. Monti was supported by other Eurozone leaders, such as Germany's Angela Merkel and former French President Nicolas Sarkozy. Merkel's spokesman, Georg Streiter, said that she had "always worked well" with Monti and "had a relationship of esteem"; however, when asked about Berlusconi, he said it was not up to him to decide domestic politics of other countries. German Finance Minister Wolfgang Schäuble added that he did not foresee "any destabilization in the euro-zone [but] expect[ed] Italy to keep going forward by respecting its European commitments." In reaction, financial markets fell on speculation of further instability; specifically, Italian 10-year bond yields rose by 0.4% to reach 4.87% and the Italian stock exchange's flagship index dropped by over 3.5%.

Campaign

From the summer of 2012, a number of parties and movements from the so-called "Third Pole" of the political spectrum, including Pier Ferdinando Casini's Union of the Centre (UdC), Gianfranco Fini's Future and Freedom (FLI), Luca Cordero di Montezemolo's Toward the Third Republic (VTR), as well as a number of other politicians from both PD and PdL, pushed for direct involvement of Mario Monti in an election. Monti's statement that he would resign after the budget was passed, was suggested by Reuters to be indicative of him seeking to run for office.

Monti also told a press conference in France that "populism" was dangerous, and he further said that a failure to pass the budget "would render more serious the government crisis, also at a European level" and that his resignation would then be "irrevocable." The two largest parties in the parliament, the PdL and the Democratic Party (PD) said they would be willing to work together to expedite passage of the budget. PD Secretary Pier Luigi Bersani said: "Faced with the irresponsibility of the right that betrayed a commitment it made a year ago before the whole country, ... Monti responded with an act of dignity that we profoundly respect." PD Deputy Secretary Enrico Letta said of the PdL's withdrawal from the government that "the financial markets will judge this latest outburst by Berlusconi and they certainly will not judge it positively." Bersani had won the centre-left primary election shortly before the PdL withdrew from the government. Following a defeat in the primary, Mayor of Florence Matteo Renzi ruled out an approach, in writing, from Berlusconi's PdL to join the party during the election. In the following weeks, both PD and Left Ecology Freedom (SEL) announced their intention to hold primary elections for MP candidates on 29 and 30 December.

The possibility of Monti directly involving himself in the election was seen as increasingly likely after the government crisis in December later that year, as Monti was invited to a European People's Party meeting at which Berlusconi was present too. A few days later, Monti published a political agenda for Italy, dubbed the "Monti agenda", and offered it to all political parties. After the Third Pole promptly agreed to use it as their own platform for the upcoming elections, talks started regarding a direct involvement of Monti as premiership candidate. On 28 December 2012, following a 4-hour meeting and after being publicly backed by the Vatican regarding a potential bid, Monti publicly announced his candidacy as head of the Third Pole, which ran in the Senate as a unique component provisionally named "Monti's Agenda for Italy", and in the Lower House as a coalition of several components.

Berlusconi said the platform his party would run on includes opposition to Monti's economic performance, which he said put Italy into a "recessive spiral without end." He also told the media, on the sidelines of AC Milan's practice session (the football club he owns along with Mediaset, the largest media outlet in the country): "I race to win. To win, everyone said there had to be a tested leader. It's not that we did not look for one. We did, and how! But there isn't one. ... I'm doing it out of a sense of responsibility." Berlusconi and Five Star Movement (M5S) leader Beppe Grillo criticised the euro-zone and Germany's influence on European policy. Grillo wrote that the average Italian "is literally terrified about the prospects of five more years of Monti-like rule."

On 8 December 2012, a new political party formed around a think tank named "Fermare il Declino" (Stop the Decline), on an initiative by the economic journalist Oscar Giannino and supported by various economists. On 19 December 2012, the name "FARE per Fermare il Declino" ("ACT to Stop The Decline") was chosen, and a list was presented with Oscar Giannino as PM candidate. The party's programme was also introduced, roughly inspiring to reduce the role of the State in the economy, reduce the national debt through disposing redundant assets, and to propose market liberalizations and privatizations.

On 29 December 2012, a new coalition, Civil Revolution (RC), was formed with the support of Italy of Values (IdV), Orange Movement (MA), Communist Refoundation Party (PRC), Party of Italian Communists (PdCI) and Federation of the Greens (FdV). It is led by celebrity magistrate Antonio Ingroia and Mayor of Naples Luigi de Magistris. FdS co-leader Paolo Ferrero said it would be a "Fourth Pole" that would bring new hope for the left. Civil Revolution attempted to solicit M5S to join them, saying "the door is open." Grillo, however, turned them down, writing on his blog "is the door for M5S open? Well, thank you, but close the door again, please."

On 7 January 2013, Berlusconi announced he had penned a coalition agreement with the Northern League (LN); as part of it, PdL will support Roberto Maroni's bid for the presidency of Lombardy, and he will run as "leader of the coalition", but suggested he could accept a role as Minister of Economy under a cabinet headed by another PdL member, such as Angelino Alfano. Later that day, LN leader Maroni confirmed his party will not support a new candidacy of Berlusconi as Prime Minister in the case of an electoral win.

Electoral system

The electoral system had been last reformed by Law no. 270, 21 December 2005.

Chamber of Deputies
For the election of the lower house, all seats in the Chamber of Deputies (excluding one deputy for the region of Aosta Valley and twelve deputies for Italians residing abroad) are allocated based on the national vote in a form of party-list proportional representation with a series of thresholds encouraging parties to form coalitions. Voters cast one vote for a closed list, meaning they cannot express a preference for individual candidates.

Parties can choose to run in coalitions. Seats are first allocated based on coalition votes, then divided among parties belonging to the same coalition by the largest remainder method. To guarantee a working majority, the coalition or party that obtains a plurality of the vote, but fewer than 340 seats, is assigned additional seats to reach that number, which is roughly 54% of all seats.

The autonomous region of Aosta Valley elects one deputy through a first-past-the-post system. Italians abroad are divided into four constituencies, which elect a total of twelve seats based on proportional representation.

Senate

For the election of the upper house, a similar system is used. However, the results are based on regional, rather than national, vote. This means the coalition or party that wins a plurality of votes in each region is guaranteed a majority of the seats assigned to that region. As this mechanism is region-based, opposing parties or coalitions may benefit from the majority bonus in different regions. It therefore does not guarantee any party or coalition a majority in the Senate.

Three regions have exceptions to the system detailed above. In the region of Molise, that is granted two seats in the Senate, seats are allocated proportionally, with no majority bonus. The region of Aosta Valley, which elects one senator, uses a first-past-the-post system. Finally, the region of Trentino-South Tyrol elects seven senators with a mixed-member proportional system: six senators are elected in six single-member constituencies, while the seventh is allocated to the most underrepresented list based on the regional votes.

Six seats in the Senate are assigned to Italians living abroad and are allocated using the same system used for the Chamber of Deputies.

Constitutionality

At the end of 2013, Italy's Constitutional Court declared that this electoral law failed to meet a number of constitutional requirements. The electoral system for the Chamber of Deputies was later reformed by Law no. 52, 6 May 2015 (commonly called Italicum).

Main coalitions and parties

Coalitions' leaders

Opinion polling

Results

Chamber of Deputies

Overall results

Italy (except Aosta Valley)

Notes

Results by region (except Aosta Valley)

Aosta Valley

The autonomous region of Aosta Valley, in northwestern Italy, elects one member to the Chamber of Deputies through a direct first-past-the-post election. Some parties that formed electoral coalitions in Italy, might have opted to run against one another (or form different coalitions) in this particular region.

Overseas constituencies

Twelve members of the Chamber of Deputies are elected by Italians abroad. Two members are elected for North America and Central America (including most of the Caribbean), four members for South America (including Trinidad and Tobago), five members for Europe, and one member for the rest of the world (Africa, Asia, Oceania, and Antarctica). Voters in these regions select candidate lists and may also cast a preference vote for individual candidates. The seats are allocated by proportional representation.

The electoral law allows for parties to form different coalitions on the lists abroad, compared to the lists in Italy. In the 2013 election, this freedom was used by Left Ecology Freedom to provide a list as an independent party, instead of making themselves available as part of the mainlands coalition with Democratic Party.

Notes

Map

Senate of the Republic

Overall results

Italy (except Aosta Valley and Trentino-Alto Adige)

Aosta Valley
The semi-autonomous region of Aosta Valley, in northwestern Italy, elects one member to the Senate through a direct first-past-the-post election. Some parties that formed electoral coalitions in Italy, might have opted to run against one another (or form different coalitions) in this particular region.

Source: Ministry of the Interior

Trentino-Alto Adige/South Tyrol
The semi-autonomous region of Trentino-Alto Adige in north Italy, including South Tyrol, elects seven members to the Senate through its six constituencies. Each constituency elects one senator by first-past-the post, while the seventh seat attributed to the region is filled by the most underrepresented party based on the overall regional result (mixed-member proportional system). Some parties that formed electoral coalitions in Italy, might have opted to run against one another (or form different coalitions) in this particular region.

Overseas constituencies
Six members of the Senate are elected by Italians abroad. One member is elected for North America and Central America (including most of the Caribbean), two members for South America (including Trinidad and Tobago), two members for Europe, and one member for the rest of the world (Africa, Asia, Oceania, and Antarctica). Voters in these regions select candidate lists and may also cast a preference vote for individual candidates. The seats are allocated by proportional representation.

The election law allow for parties to form other electoral coalitions on the lists abroad, compared to the lists in Italy. In the 2013 electional list for the Senate all parties were listed independently without any coalitions formed. None of the parties were neither in internal coalitions at the mainland; so in 2013 the electoral situation abroad actually was not different compared to the electoral situation at the mainland.

Results by region

Map

Reactions
In most of the rest of Europe, Bersani would have had more than enough support to form a government in his own right, as Italy Common Good won a decisive majority in the Chamber of Deputies. In Italy, unlike in most other parliamentary democracies, the Chamber of Deputies and the Senate have equal power. Governments must thus maintain the confidence of both houses, and require a majority in both houses to pass legislation. As Italy Common Good was 35 seats short of a majority in the Senate, it could not form government on its own. Bersani said that Italy was in a "dramatic situation". Italian and global shares fell as the result became clear, with the value of the euro also dropping. Strong results for anti-austerity parties were interpreted as showing popular opposition to the austerity measures of the Monti government, with the populist Five Star Movement considered to have had a strong election. Analysts were uncertain as to how this new party would behave in the legislature.

On 26 February, La Repubblica ran the headline "Boost for Grillo: Italy ungovernable", whilst Il Giornale described Berlusconi's result as a miracle. Il Messaggero declared: "The winner is ungovernability."

Government formation

Formal talks to form a new government were expected to start on 10 March with the official confirmation of the results and the convening of the Italian Parliament. The formation task immediately turned out to be tough due to the absence of a clear majority in the Senate, with Giorgio Napolitano being unable to dissolve Parliament due to constitutional constraints forbidding a president from doing so during the last six months of his term.

On 22 March, after the election of house speakers Laura Boldrini and Piero Grasso, and after two days of consultations with all the parliamentary groups, Napolitano designated Pier Luigi Bersani with the task of forming a new government. Bersani immediately ruled out the possibility of a grand coalition with Berlusconi's right-wing coalition, and instead tried to form a minority government supported by the Five Star Movement. On 28 March, after formal talks with Napolitano, Bersani admitted there was no chance to form such a government. Given the troubles in forming a majority coalition, Napolitano then decided to directly form two informal bipartisan commissions with the task of agreeing on a number of shared reforms.

At the same time, a new presidential election was called for 18 April. However, the lack of a clear majority turned out to be problematic also in this scenario, as the first five ballots failed to elect a candidate. The Democratic Party split into several factions due to internal conflicts involving the support of party candidates Franco Marini and Romano Prodi, leading to Bersani's resignation as party leader. On the sixth ballot, in an unprecedented move, Napolitano was elected for a second term as Italian president.

Successively, Napolitano started talks again and on 24 April appointed the Democratic Party's deputy secretary Enrico Letta as designated prime minister on 28 April, he announced that he had managed to form a grand coalition of his Democratic Party, the People of Freedom, Civic Choice, the Union of the Centre and the Radicals that would take office and seek a vote of confidence the next day. The same day as the swearing-in a gunman opened fire at the prime minister's office, Palazzo Chigi, injuring two police officers. Letta told parliament in his inaugural speech "Italy is dying from austerity alone. Growth policies cannot wait." He added that there would not be a property tax imposed and that a "fairer" system for the less affluent was being worked. He also won the vote of confidence by 453 votes to 153.

Notes

Literature 
 
  Preview of chapter.
  (Uses data from the Italian general election of 2013.)

References

External links
2013 Italian Parliamentary Election Pre-Election Report, The Monkey Cage, 19 February 2013
Italy Election Data, European Journal of Political Research-Political Data Yearbook: Interactive

2013
General election
February 2013 events in Italy